Apoctena orthocopa, also known as striped ponga leaf-tyer, is a species of moth of the family Tortricidae. It is endemic to New Zealand, where it is found only on the North Island.

Taxonomy 
This species was first described by Edward Meyrick in 1924 and named Tortrix orthocopa. The specimens used by Meyrick were collected by George Hudson in Wellington in January.

Description 
The larvae of this species are pale green with a brown head and when mature are up to 20 mm in length.

Meyrick described the adults of this species as follows:

Distribution 
This species is endemic to New Zealand and is found in the North Island.

Behaviour 
The larva of this species fold the fronds of its host and tie them with silk creating a shelter in which to hide. The adult of this species is on the wing from January to March.

Host plant 
The larvae feed on Cyathea species including the silver fern.

References

Moths described in 1924
Epitymbiini
Moths of New Zealand
Endemic fauna of New Zealand
Endemic moths of New Zealand